The Pareto priority index (PPI), so named because of its connection with the Pareto principle, which is in turn named after the economist Vilfredo Pareto, can be used to prioritize several (quality improvement) projects.  It is especially used in the surroundings of six sigma projects.  It has first been established by AT&T.

The PPI is calculated as follows:

 

A high PPI suggests a high project priority.

References

Secondary sector of the economy
Vilfredo Pareto